Aldair Neves Paulo Faustino (born 11 October 1999), simply known as Aldair, is a Portuguese footballer who plays as a right back for A.D. Sanjoanense, on loan from Spanish club SD Ponferradina.

Club career
Aldair was born in Torres Vedras, and played for the youth sides of S.C.U. Torreense before making his senior debut with AMCR Fonte Grada in the Lisbon FA third division during the 2016–17 season. In 2017, he returned to Torreense and returned to the youth setup.

In 2019, Aldair moved to Académica de Coimbra and was initially assigned to the under-23 squad. On 15 October of the following year, he signed for A.D. Sanjoanense.

On 13 July 2022, Aldair moved abroad for the first time in his career, signing a three-year contract with Spanish Segunda División side SD Ponferradina. He made his professional debut on 15 August, coming on as a second-half substitute for Dani Ojeda in a 3–2 away win over FC Cartagena.

On 31 January 2023, Aldair returned to Sanjoanense on loan for the remainder of the 2022–23 Liga 3.

References

External links

1999 births
Living people
People from Torres Vedras
Portuguese footballers
Association football defenders
Campeonato de Portugal (league) players
S.C.U. Torreense players
Associação Académica de Coimbra – O.A.F. players
A.D. Sanjoanense players
Segunda División players
SD Ponferradina players
Portuguese expatriate footballers
Portuguese expatriate sportspeople in Spain
Expatriate footballers in Spain